Gatow, a district of south-western Berlin is located west of the Havelsee lake and has forested areas within its boundaries. It is within the borough of Spandau. On 31 December 2002, it had 5,532 inhabitants.

History
Gatow's existence was first recorded in 1258 under the name of Gatho. In 1558, the village of Gatow became part of Spandau. Following the division of Berlin into four sectors at the end of the Second World War, Gatow became part of the British sector of West Berlin in early July 1945.

Infrastructures

Today's General-Steinhoff-Kaserne was between 1934 and 1994 home to an airfield, first used by the Luftwaffe as a staff and technical college, Luftkriegsschule II, and then by the Royal Air Force and Army Air Corps as RAF Gatow. RAF Gatow has the unlikely distinction of having been home during the Berlin Airlift to the only known operational use of flying boats within central Europe, when the RAF used Short Sunderlands to transport salt from Hamburg to Berlin, landing on the Havelsee lake.

The airfield was handed back to the Luftwaffe on 7 September 1994 and was kept in use as an airfield for a very short time, being closed to air traffic in 1995. It is now called General-Steinhoff-Kaserne and is home to some non-flying Luftwaffe units, and the Luftwaffen Museum der Bundeswehr. This is the museum of the Luftwaffe which has many displays (including historic aircraft) and much information on German military aviation and the history of the airfield. Admission to the museum is free, and full details of the museum and how to get there are on the museum's website . The history of RAF Gatow and of western forces in Berlin from 1945 to 1994 is told in the Alliierten Museum (Allied Museum) .

Also on the site of the former RAF station, but not part of General-Steinhoff-Kaserne, is a school, the Hans-Carossa-Gymnasium, and houses for government employees of the Federal Republic of Germany. This has been from 2003 part of the district of Berlin-Kladow.

References

External links

 Gatow page on www.berlin.de
 Gatow Volunteer Fire Brigade (in German)
 German site about a tower in Gatow
 Website of the Gatow branch of the Christian Democratic Union (in German)
 Luftwaffen Museum der Bundeswehr (official website)
 West Alliierte in Berlin e.V.
 Planeboys Spotters' page on Gatow
 The Hans-Carossa-Gymnasium (in German)
 The history of Gatow Airfield in German - a project of the Hans-Carossa-Gymnasium
 Alliierten Museum (The Allied Museum) - museum of the history of western forces in Berlin and Germany from 1945 to 1994

Localities of Berlin